The Milch classification is a system of categorizing single column (AO type B) distal humerus fractures based on the pattern of epicondyle involvement.  It is distinct from the Jupiter classification which is used for bicolumnar distal humerus fractures.

Classification

References
 Orthobullets

Injuries of shoulder and upper arm
Orthopedic classifications